Tall-e Mohammad Yusof (also Romanized as Tall-e Moḩammad Yūsof; also known as Halleh Tall) is a village in Shurab Rural District, Veysian District, Dowreh County, Lorestan Province, Iran. At the 2006 census, its population was 170, in 39 families.

References 

Towns and villages in Dowreh County